Alex Freitas may refer to:
Alexandre Freitas (grappler) (born 1972), Brazilian grappler
Alex Freitas (footballer, born 1988), Brazilian footballer who plays as a defender
Alex Freitas (footballer, born 1991), Portuguese footballer who plays as a winger
Alexander Freitas (born 1990), Canadian wrestler better known by the stage name Alex Silva